

In books
(Not mentioned in other sections)
Spatz Antonelli - Artemis Fowl: The Eternity Code
Papa Arnold - The Warriors
Enrico Balazar - The Drawing of the Three
Capa Vencarlo Barsavi - The Lies of Locke Lamora
Frank Bellarosa - The Gold Coast
Ernst Stavro Blofeld - James Bond
Julian DiGeorge - The Executioner (book series)
Gentleman John Marcone - The Dresden Files
Professor Moriarty - Sherlock Holmes
Ismael Rivera - The Warriors
Chrysophrase the Troll - Discworld

In comics
Black Tarantula - Marvel Comics
Oswald Chesterfield "The Penguin" Cobblepot - Batman
Harvey "Two-Face" Dent - Batman
Diavolo - JoJo's Bizarre Adventure
Sir Edmund "King Snake" Dorrance - Batman
Morgan Edge - Superman
Carmine "The Roman" Falcone - Batman
Wilson "The Kingpin" Fisk - Marvel Comics
Don Fortunato - Marvel Comics
John Genovese - Kick-Ass
Giorno Giovanna - JoJo's Bizarre Adventure
Hammerhead - Marvel Comics
Akira Hojo - Sanctuary
Jiji - Ichi the Killer
The Joker - DC Comics
Kakihara - Ichi the Killer
Lonnie Thompson "Tombstone" Lincoln - Marvel Comics
Lex Luthor - DC Comics
Giacomo Magliozzi - Sin City
Silvio "Silvermane" Manfredi - Marvel Comics
Bruno "Ugly" Mannheim - Superman
Salvatore "The Boss" Maroni - Batman
Roberto Rastapopoulos - The Adventures of Tintin
John Rooney - Road to Perdition
The Rose - Spider-Man
Stoneface - Marvel Comics
Billy "Jigsaw" Russo - Marvel Comics
Tsunayoshi "Tsuna" Sawada - Katekyo Hitman REBORN!
Roman "Black Mask" Sionis - Batman
Cornell "Cottonmouth" Stokes - Marvel Comics
Rupert Thorne - Batman
Viper - Marvel Comics
Herr Wallenquist - Sin City
Arnold "The Ventriloquist" Wesker - Batman
Tobias Whale - DC Comics
Warren "Great White Shark" White - Batman
Tony Zucco - Batman

In film
Bangun (Tio Pakusadewo) - The Raid 2
Bejo (Alex Abbad) - The Raid 2
Mr. Big (John Vernon) - I'm Gonna Git You Sucka
Mr. Big (Yaphet Kotto) - Live and Let Die
Mr. Big (Maurice LaMarche) - Zootopia
The Big City Agent - The Trumpet of the Swan
Big Meat (The Game) - Waist Deep
Don Altobello (Eli Wallach) - The Godfather Part III
Mark Antony (Raghuvaran) - Basha
Manick Baasha (Rajinikanth) - Basha
Damian Baine (Wyclef Jean) - Dirty
Caesar Enrico Bandello (Edward G. Robinson) - Little Caesar
Armando Barillo (Willem Dafoe) - Once Upon a Time in Mexico
Charlie Barret (Christopher Walken) - Suicide Kings
Eddie Bartlett (James Cagney) - The Roaring Twenties
Emilio Barzini (Richard Conte) - The Godfather
Teddy Bass (Ian McShane) - Sexy Beast
Beans (Beanie Sigel) - State Property 2
Mickey Bergman (Danny DeVito) - Heist
Big Baby Sweets (Violent J) - Big Money Hustlas
Biggs (Kymani Marley) - Shottas
David (Kiefer Sutherland) - The Lost Boys
David Billa (Rajinikanth) - Billa (1980)
David Billa (Ajith Kumar) - Billa (2007)
Raymond Blossom (Timothy Hutton) - Playing God
Clarence Boddicker (Kurtwood Smith) - RoboCop
Maynard Boyle (John Vernon) - Charley Varrick
Rory Breaker (Vas Blackwood) - Lock, Stock and Two Smoking Barrels
Carlito Brigante (Al Pacino) - Carlito's Way
Carlito Brigante (Jay Hernandez) - Carlito's Way: Rise to Power
Mr. Bronson (Kris Kristofferson) - Payback
John Brown (Raymond Massey) - Santa Fe Trail 
Nino Brown (Wesley Snipes) - New Jack City
Teddy Bruckshot (Louie Rankin) - Shottas
Bucho (Joaquim de Almeida) - Desperado
Adam "Duke" Byron (Brian Donlevy) - Heaven Only Knows
Joe Cabot (Lawrence Tierney) - Reservoir Dogs
Antonio "Tony" Camonte (Paul Muni) - Scarface
Al Capone (Robert De Niro) - The Untouchables
Al Capone (Ben Gazzara) - Capone
Alphonse "Big Boy" Caprice (Al Pacino) - Dick Tracy
Ben Carter (John Carradine) - Frontier Marshal
Mr. Carter (William Devane) - Payback
Johnny Caspar (Jon Polito) - Miller's Crossing
Chang (John Lone) - War
Lao Che (Roy Chiao) - Indiana Jones and the Temple of Doom
Cleon (Dorsey Wright) - The Warriors
Domenico Clericuzio (Danny Aiello) - The Last Don
Vincenzzo Coccotti (Christopher Walken) - True Romance
Mickey Cohen (Sean Penn) - Gangster Squad
Mickey Cohen (Harvey Keitel) - Bugsy
Lenny Cole (Tom Wilkinson) - RocknRolla
Spats Colombo (George Raft) - Some Like It Hot
Michael Corleone (Al Pacino) - The Godfather, The Godfather Part II, and The Godfather Part III
Santino "Sonny" Corleone (James Caan) - The Godfather
Vito Corleone (Marlon Brando and Robert De Niro) - The Godfather and The Godfather Part II
Frank Costello (Jack Nicholson) - The Departed
Ralph Cotter (James Cagney) - Kiss Tomorrow Goodbye
Ottilio Cuneo (Rudy Bond) - The Godfather
Richie Cusack (William Hurt) - A History of Violence
Bill "The Butcher" Cutting (Daniel Day-Lewis) - Gangs of New York
Cyrus (Roger Hill) - The Warriors
Frank D'Amico (Mark Strong) - Kick-Ass
Dame (Damon Dash) - State Property 2
Cross De Lena (Jason Gedrick) - The Last Don
Abraham "Cousin Avi" Denovitz (Dennis Farina) - Snatch
Malik El Djebena (Tahar Rahim) - A Prophet
Don (Amitabh Bachchan) - Don
Don (Shahrukh Khan) - Don: The Chase Begins Again
Batiste Duryea (Brian Donlevy) - This Is My Affair
Jocko Dundee (Peter Boyle) - Johnny Dangerously
Edge - The Warriors
Justin Fairfax (James Coburn) - Payback
Faisal (Matt Schulze) - Out of Reach
Carmine "The Roman" Falcone (Tom Wilkinson) - Batman Begins
Don Falcone (Roy Scheider) - Romeo Is Bleeding
Don Fanucci (Gastone Moschin) - The Godfather Part II
Frankie Faulkner (Fred Clark) - Alias Nick Beal
Signor Ferrari (Sydney Greenstreet) - Casablanca
Gianni Franco (Jeroen Krabbé) - The Punisher
Casanova Frankenstein (Geoffrey Rush) - Mystery Men
Johnny Friendly (Lee J. Cobb) - On the Waterfront
Tatsumi Fuwa (Hiroshi Vava) - Sign Gene
Edward J. "Blackie" Gallagher (Clark Gable) - Manhattan Melodrama
The Gangster (Paul Bettany and Malcolm McDowell) - Gangster No. 1
Hideaki Goto (Kenichi Endo) - The Raid 2
Moe Greene (Alex Rocco) - The Godfather
Thomas "Juntao" Griffin (Tom Wilkinson) - Rush Hour
Carl Grissom (Jack Palance) - Batman
Bill Guerrard (Randy Quaid) - The Ice Harvest
George Hally (Humphrey Bogart) - The Roaring Twenties
Marcus Hubbard (Fredric March) - Another Part of the Forest
Jabba the Hutt (Larry Ward) - Star Wars
"Ten Grand" Jackson (Steve Cochran) - Wonder Man 
Doc Johnson (Richard Ward) - Across 110th Street
Bumpy Jonas (Moses Gunn) - Shaft
Alexei Jovanovic (David Ogden Stiers) - Jungle 2 Jungle
George Jung (Johnny Depp) - Blow
Eddie Kagle (Paul Muni) - Angel on My Shoulder
Teddy KGB (John Malkovich) - Rounders
Shoaib Khan (Emraan Hashmi) - Once Upon a Time in Mumbaai
Kokki Kumar (Dhanush) - Pudhupettai
Kuroda - Into the Sun
Ben Larkin (John Vernon) - Brannigan
Henry Lee (Ric Young) - The Corruptor
Joe Lilac (Dana Andrews) - Ball of Fire
Don Edward Lino (Robert De Niro) - Shark Tale
Doyle Lonnegan (Robert Shaw) - The Sting
"Hatchet" Harry Lonsdale (P. H. Moriarty) - Lock, Stock and Two Smoking Barrels
Frank Lopez (Robert Loggia) - Scarface
Patti LoPresti (Cathy Moriarty-Gentile) - Analyze That
Frank Lucas (Denzel Washington) - American Gangster
Licio Lucchesi (Enzo Robutti) - The Godfather Part III
César Luciani (Niels Arestrup) - A Prophet
Luther (David Patrick Kelly) - The Warriors
Doctor Mabuse, (Rudolf Klein-Rogge and Wolfgang Preiss) - Dr. Mabuse the Gambler and subsequent films
Majestic (Adewale Akinnuoye-Agbaje) - Get Rich or Die Tryin'
The Man with the Plan (Christopher Walken) - Things to Do in Denver When You're Dead
Vincent Mancini-Corleone (Andy García) - The Godfather Part III
Duke Mantee (Humphrey Bogart) - The Petrified Forest
Dominic Manetta (Joseph Rigano) - Analyze This
"Killer" Mannion (Edward G. Robinson) - The Whole Town's Talking
Roman Maroni (Richard Dimitri) - Johnny Dangerously
Sal Maroni (Eric Roberts) - The Dark Knight
Hugo Martinez (Sergio Peris-Mencheta) - Rambo: Last Blood
Gino Marzzone (Richard C. Sarafian) - Bound
Masai (Edward Sewer) - The Warriors
Max (Edward Herrmann) - The Lost Boys
Peter McAllister (Mitchell Ryan) - Lethal Weapon
Whip McCord (Humphrey Bogart) - The Oklahoma Kid
Boss McGinty (Roy Emerton) - The Triumph of Sherlock Holmes
Frank Miller (Ian MacDonald) - High Noon
Frank Milo (Bill Murray) - Mad Dog and Glory
Sultan Mirza (Ajay Devgan) - Once Upon a Time in Mumbaai
Moco (Peter Marquardt) - El Mariachi
Momo (Ron Karabatsos) - Get Shorty
Monarch (Jay Leno) - Igor
Tony Montana (Al Pacino) - Scarface
Morelle (Ralph Richardson) - Bulldog Jack
John Murrell (Humphrey Bogart) - Virginia City
Subhash Nagre (Amitabh Bachchan) - Sarkar
Jack "The Joker" Napier (Jack Nicholson) - Batman
Velu Nayagan (Kamal Haasan) - Nayakan
Niko (Orestes Matacena) - The Mask
Blackie Norton (Clark Gable) - San Francisco
O-Ren Ishii (Lucy Liu) - Kill Bill
Leo O'Bannon (Albert Finney) - Miller's Crossing
Uri Omovich (Karel Roden) - RocknRolla
Joseph Palmi (Joe Pesci) - The Good Shepherd
Paris (Avery Brooks) - The Big Hit
Luke Plummer (Tom Tyler) - Stagecoach
"Brick Top" Polford (Alan Ford) - Snatch
Tom Powers (James Cagney) - The Public Enemy
Top Dollar (Michael Wincott) - The Crow
Sir Humphrey Pengallan (Charles Laughton) - Jamaica Inn
James Lionel "Jimmy" Price (Kenneth Cranham) - Layer Cake
Morgan Price (Robert Forster) - Confidence
Dan Quigley (James Cagney) - Lady Killer
Lou "The Wrench" Rigazzi (Frank Gio) - Analyze That
Mendy Ripstein (Peter Falk) - Undisputed
Tama Riyadi (Ray Sahetapy) - The Raid
Johnny Rocco (Edward G. Robinson) - Key Largo
Romeo (Clifton Collins Jr.) - The Boondock Saints II: All Saints Day
John Rooney (Paul Newman) - Road to Perdition
Hyman Roth (Lee Strasberg) - The Godfather Part II
Arjen Rudd (Joss Ackland) - Lethal Weapon 2
Tony "The Tiger" Russo (Dean Stockwell) - Married to the Mob
Howard Saint (John Travolta) - The Punisher
Franz Sanchez (Robert Davi) - Licence to Kill
Nicky Santoro (Joe Pesci) - Casino
Schränker (Gustaf Gründgens) - M
Semyon (Armin Mueller-Stahl) - Eastern Promises
Jimmy Serrano (Dennis Farina) - Midnight Run
Harold Shand (Bob Hoskins) - The Long Good Friday
Shiro (Ryo Ishibashi) - War
Bill Sykes (Robert Loggia) - Oliver & Company
Sid - The Warriors
Primo Sidone (Chazz Palminteri) - Analyze This
Alejandro Sosa (Paul Shenar) - Scarface
Keyser Söze - The Usual Suspects
Primo Sparazza (Joseph Ruskin) - Smokin' Aces
Spike (William Haade) - Down to Earth
Starr (Kate Klugman) - The Warriors
Austin Stoneman (Ralph Lewis) - The Birth of a Nation
Anthony Stracci (Don Costello) - The Godfather
Rocky Sullivan (James Cagney) - Angels with Dirty Faces
Sully (Paul Greco) - The Warriors
Jin Sun (Terry Chen) - Stark Raving Mad
Surya (Rajinikanth) - Thalapathi
Swan (Michael Beck) - The Warriors
Victor Sweets (Chiwetel Ejiofor) - Four Brothers
Joey Tai (John Lone) - Year of the Dragon
Ricky Tan (John Lone) - Rush Hour 2
Philip Tattaglia (Victor Rendina) - The Godfather
Kinman Tau (Tzi Ma) - Rapid Fire
Eddie Temple (Michael Gambon) - Layer Cake
Don Massimo Torricelli (Michele Morrone) - 365 Days
Jack Travis (Stuart Wilson) - Lethal Weapon 3
Alec Trevelyan (Sean Bean) - GoldenEye
Dorian Tyrell (Peter Greene) - The Mask
Uncle Bart (Bob Hoskins) - Unleashed
Uncle Benny (Kim Chan) - Lethal Weapon 4
Uncle Nikolai (Levan Uchaneishvili) - 25th Hour
Liberty Valance (Lee Marvin) - The Man Who Shot Liberty Valance
Eddie Valentine (Paul Sorvino) - The Rocketeer
Vance (Konrad Sheehan) - The Warriors
Ray Vargo (Henry Silva) - Ghost Dog: The Way of the Samurai
Vijay Verma (Amitabh Bachchan) - Deewaar
Siddharth Abhimanyu (Arvind Swamy) - Thani Oruvan
Paul Vitti (Robert De Niro) - Analyze This and Analyze That
Marsellus Wallace (Ving Rhames) - Pulp Fiction
Harry Waters (Ralph Fiennes) - In Bruges
Brad Wesley (Ben Gazzara) - Road House
Frank White (Christopher Walken) - King of New York
Smiley Williams (Hardie Albright) - Angel on My Shoulder
Johnny Wong (Anthony Wong) - Hard Boiled
Giuseppe "Papa Joe" Yakavetta (Carlo Rota) - The Boondock Saints
Aniki Yamamoto (Takeshi Kitano) - Brother
Boris "The Blade" Yurinov (Rade Šerbedžija) - Snatch
Joe Zaluchi (Louis Guss) - The Godfather
Paul Zapatti (Anthony Franciosa) - City Hall
Joey Zasa (Joe Mantegna) - The Godfather Part III
Hopper (Kevin Spacey) - A Bug's Life
Drago Bludvist (Djimon Hounsou) - How to Train your Dragon 2
Valentin Zukovsky (Robbie Coltrane) - GoldenEye and The World Is Not Enough
 Orian "The Wolfking" "Niagara" Franklin (Jeff Goldblum) - Hotel Artemis

In television
Simon Adebisi (Adewale Akinnuoye-Agbaje) - Oz
Johnny Allen (Billy Murray) - EastEnders
Marcus Álvarez (Emilio Rivera) - Sons of Anarchy
Jackie Aprile, Sr. (Michael Rispoli) - The Sopranos
Colin Atkinson (Tristan Rogers) - The Young and the Restless
Avon Barksdale (Wood Harris) - The Wire
Stringer Bell (Idris Elba) - The Wire
Sacha Belov (Sergei Bezrukov) - Brigada
Fraser Black (Jesse Birdsall) - Hollyoaks
Grace Black (Tamara Wall) - Hollyoaks
Jimmy Cacuzza (Jeff Wincott) - Sons of Anarchy
Rocco Cammeniti (Robert Forza) - Neighbours
Al Capone (Stephen Graham) - Boardwalk Empire
Fat Cat (Jim Cummings) - Chip 'n Dale Rescue Rangers
Fyodor Chevchenko (Roy Scheider) - Third Watch
Bill Church, Jr. (Bruce Campbell) - Lois & Clark: The New Adventures of Superman
Bill Church, Sr. (Peter Boyle) - Lois & Clark: The New Adventures of Superman
Beaver Cleaver & Wally Cleaver - Teenage Mutant Ninja Turtles (1987)
Domenic Cosoleto (Louis Ferreira) - Bad Blood
Mama Binturong (Rachel House) - The Lion Guard
Michael "Sonny" Corinthos Jr. (Maurice Benard) - General Hospital
Freddie Cork (Kevin Chapman) - Brotherhood
Carlos Cortez (Steven Bauer) - UC: Undercover
Jack Dalton (Hywel Bennett) - EastEnders
Anthony "Fat Tony" D'Amico (Joe Mantegna) - The Simpsons
Ernest Darby (Mitch Pileggi) - Sons of Anarchy
King Dedede (Ed Paul) - Kirby: Right Back at Ya!
Stefano DiMera (Joseph Mascolo) - Days of Our Lives
EJ DiMera (James Scott) - Days of Our Lives
Anthony "Tony" Dracon (Richard Grieco) - Gargoyles
Morgan Edge (Rutger Hauer and Patrick Bergin) - Smallville
Carl Elias (Enrico Colantoni - Person of Interest
Squilliam Fancyson (Dee Bradley Baker) - SpongeBob SquarePants
Long Feng (Clancy Brown) - Avatar: The Last Airbender
Fred Flintstone (Maurice LaMarche) - Harvey Birdman
Gustavo Fring (Giancarlo Esposito) - Breaking Bad and Better Call Saul
Miguel Galindo (Danny Pino) - Mayans MC
Escobar Gallardo (Robert LaSardo) - Nip/Tuck
Declan Gardiner (Kim Coates) - Bad Blood
James "Ghost" St. Patrick/Ghost (Omari Hardwick) - Power (TV Series)
Giovanni (Ted Lewis) - Pokémon
The Greek (Bill Raymond) - The Wire
Steven Green (Victor Slezak) - Law & Order
Carlos Guerrero (Rudolf Martin) - Dexter
Raoul "El Cid" Hernandez (Luis Guzmán) - Oz
Andy Hunter (Michael Higgs) - EastEnders
Alicia Jimenez (Ana de la Reguera) - Power (TV Series)
Diego Jimenez (Maurice Compte) - Power (TV Series)
Victor Kiriakis (John Aniston) - Days of Our Lives
Ryuichiro Kuroda (Dan Green) - Gokusen
Fearless Leader (Bill Scott) - The Adventures of Rocky and Bullwinkle and Friends
Phil Leotardo (Frank Vincent) - The Sopranos
Henry Lin (Kenneth Choi) - Sons of Anarchy
Felipe Lobos (Enrique Murciano) - Power
War Lord (Philip Madoc) - Doctor Who
Big Louie - Teenage Mutant Ninja Turtles (1987)
Ray Luca (Anthony Denison) - Crime Story
Carmine Lupertazzi (Tony Lip) - The Sopranos
Bruno "Ugly" Mannheim (Bruce Weitz) - Superman: The Animated Series
Salvatore Maranzano (Cris D'Annunzio) - Torchwood
Frank Masucci (Charles Cioffi) - Law & Order
Milo McCrary (John J. York) - Drake & Josh Go Hollywood
Pinky McFingers - Teenage Mutant Ninja Turtles (1987)
Fish Mooney (Jada Pinkett Smith) - Gotham
Enrique Morales (David Zayas) - Oz
Jason Morgan (Steve Burton) - General Hospital
Adelei Niska (Michael Fairman) - Firefly
Jim Moriarty (Andrew Scott) - Sherlock
Clay Morrow (Ron Perlman) - Sons of Anarchy
Alberto Napoli (Frank Savino) - Law & Order
Antonio Nappa (Mark Margolis) - Oz
Chucky Pancamo (Chuck Zito) - Oz
Big Fat Paulie (Michael Chiklis) - Family Guy
Rick Pinzolo (Stanley Tucci) - Wiseguy
Plankton (Doug Lawrence) - SpongeBob SquarePants
Damon Pope (Harold Perrineau) - Sons Of Anarchy
Mel Profitt (Kevin Spacey) - Wiseguy
Rancid Rabbit (Billy West) - CatDog
Quito Real (Ving Rhames) - UC: Undercover
Jimmy Reardon (Ian Tracey) - Intelligence
Burr Redding (Anthony Chisholm) - Oz
Frederico Righetti (Joseph Ragno) - Law & Order
Nicolo Rizzuto (Paul Sorvino) - Bad Blood
Vito Rizzuto (Anthony LaPaglia) - Bad Blood
Doctor Ivo Robotnik (Long John Baldry) - Adventures of Sonic the Hedgehog
John "Johnny Sack" Sacrimoni (Vincent Curatola) - The Sopranos
Hector Salamanca (Mark Margolis) - Breaking Bad and Better Call Saul
Tuco Salamanca (Raymond Cruz) - Breaking Bad and Better Call Saul
Giuseppe "Dom Peppino" Sarti (Lima Duarte) - I Love Paraisopolis
Nino Schibetta (Tony Musante) - Oz
Peter Schibetta (Eddie Malavarca) - Oz
Vernon Schillinger (J. K. Simmons) - Oz
Anthony "Tony" Soprano (James Gandolfini) - The Sopranos
Corrado "Junior" Soprano (Dominic Chianese) - The Sopranos
Marlo Stanfield (Jamie Hector) - The Wire
Sonny Steelgrave (Ray Sharkey) - Wiseguy
James Stenbeck, (Anthony Herrera) - As the World Turns
Joseph "Proposition Joe" Stewart (Robert F. Chew) - The Wire
Ernest Strepfinger (Tim Curry, Brad Garrett, and Jim Cummings) - Ozzy & Drix
Nucky Thompson (Steve Buscemi) - Boardwalk Empire
Rupert Thorne (John Vernon) - Batman: The Animated Series
Jackson "Jax" Teller (Charlie Hunnam) - Sons Of Anarchy
John Thomas "J.T." Teller (Victor Newmark) - Sons Of Anarchy
Johnny Torrio (Greg Antonacci) - Boardwalk Empire
Master Udon (Pat Morita) - SpongeBob SquarePants
Valmont (Julian Sands) - Jackie Chan Adventures
Tony Vivaldi - Teenage Mutant Ninja Turtles (1987)
Constantin Volsky (Olek Krupa) - Law & Order
Spiros Vondopoulos (Paul Ben-Victor) - The Wire
Don Eladio Vuente (Steven Bauer) - Breaking Bad and Better Call Saul
Sonny Walker (William Forsythe) - UC: Undercover
Jack Welker (Michael Bowen) - Breaking Bad
Walter White (Bryan Cranston) - Breaking Bad
Johnny Zacchara (Brandon Barash) - General Hospital
Annalisa Zucca (Sofia Milos) - The Sopranos
Tony Zucco (Thomas F. Wilson and Mark Hamill) - Batman: The Animated Series and The Batman
Don Vizioso (Brian Bloom) - Teenage Mutant Ninja Turtles (2012)
Dark Kat (Brock Peters) - Swat Kats
Giorno Giovanna (Kenshō Ono) - JoJo's Bizarre Adventure (TV series)

In video games 
Kazuo Akuji - Saints Row 2
Shogo Akuji (Yuri Lowenthal) - Saints Row 2
Archie - Pokémon Sapphire and Pokémon Emerald
Baka - Fallout demo
Baka - Mafia 3
Micah Bell (Peter Blomquist) - Red Dead Redemption II
Bad Bessie (Heather Simms) - Red Dead Revolver
John Bishop - Fallout 2
The Boss - Saints Row 2, Saints Row: The Third, and Saints Row IV
Angelo Bronte (Jim Pirri) - Red Dead Redemption 2
Bullet - The Warriors
Thomas Burke - Mafia 3
Bruto Cadaverini - Phoenix Wright: Ace Attorney − Trials and Tribulations
Avery Carrington (Burt Reynolds) - Grand Theft Auto: Vice City, Grand Theft Auto: San Andreas, and Grand Theft Auto: Liberty City Stories
Cassandra - Mafia 3
Catalina (Cynthia Farrell) - Grand Theft Auto III and Grand Theft Auto: San Andreas
Lincoln Clay (Alex Hernandez) - Mafia 3
Cleon (Dorsey Wright) - The Warriors
Alberto Clemente (Nolan North) - Mafia 2
Chatterbox (Jordan Gelber) - The Warriors
Wei Cheng (George Cheung) - Grand Theft Auto V
Crackerjack (Adam Sietz) - The Warriors
Jacob Crow (Wayne Forester) - TimeSplitters: Future Perfect
Cobb - The Warriors
The Colonel - TimeSplitters 2
Vito Corleone (Doug Abrahams) - The Godfather
Don Corneo - Final Fantasy VII
Colonel Juan García Cortez (Robert Davi) - Grand Theft Auto: Vice City and Grand Theft Auto: Vice City Stories
Cyrus - Pokémon Diamond and Pearl
Cyrus (Michael Potts) - The Warriors
Butch DeLoria (Craig Sechler) - Fallout 3
Viola DeWynter (Sasha Grey) - Saints Row: The Third  Saints Row: Gat out of Hell
Ricardo Diaz (Luis Guzmán) - Grand Theft Auto: Vice City and Grand Theft Auto: Vice City Stories
Diego (Lloyd Floyd) - The Warriors
Donny - TimeSplitters: Future Perfect
Edge (El-P) - The Warriors
Javier Escuella (Antonio Jaramillo) - Red Dead Redemption
Carlo Falcone (André Sogliuzzo) - Mafia 2
Mikhail Faustin (Karel Roden) - Grand Theft Auto IV
Fuyuhiko Kuzuryu - Danganronpa 2: Goodbye Despair
Mondo Owada - Danganronpa: Trigger Happy Havoc
Sonny Forelli (Tom Sizemore) - Grand Theft Auto: Vice City
Paulie Franchetti (Dwight Schultz) - The Darkness
The General (Greg Eagles) - Saints Row 2
Ghost - The Warriors
Giovanni - Pokémon Red and Blue and Pokémon FireRed and LeafGreen
Gizmo (Jim Cummings) - Fallout
Gonzap - Pokémon Colosseum and Pokémon XD: Gale of Darkness
Jon Gravelli (Madison Arnold) - Grand Theft Auto IV
Greevil - Pokémon XD: Gale of Darkness
Jonah (Poison Pen) - The Warriors
Pig Josh (Dennis Ostermaier) - Red Dead Revolver
Archibald Khallos - TimeSplitters 2 and TimeSplitters: Future Perfect
Eddie "Killbane" Pryor (Rick D. Wasserman) - Saints Row: The Third
Benjamin King (Michael Clarke Duncan and Terry Crews) - Saints Row and Saints Row IV
The King (James Horan) - Fallout: New Vegas
Knox (Lee Aaron Rosen) - The Warriors
Krew (William Minkin) - Jak II
Sean "Sweet" Johnson (Faizon Love) - Grand Theft Auto: San Andreas
Asuka Kasen (Lianna Pai) - Grand Theft Auto III
Kazuki Kasen (Keenan Shimizu) - Grand Theft Auto: Liberty City Stories
Johnny Klebitz (Scott Hill) - Grand Theft Auto IV, Grand Theft Auto IV: The Lost and Damned and Grand Theft Auto V
Vladimir Lem (Dominic Hawksley and Jonathan Davis) - Max Payne and Max Payne 2: The Fall of Max Payne
Salvatore Leone (Frank Vincent) - Grand Theft Auto III, Grand Theft Auto: San Andreas, and Grand Theft Auto: Liberty City Stories
Julius Little (Keith David) - Saints Row, Saints Row 2, and Saints Row IV
Angelo Lopez (Freddy Rodriguez) - Saints Row
Hector Lopez (Joaquim de Almeida) - Saints Row
Phillipe Loren (Jacques Hennequet) - Saints Row: The Third
Donald Love (Kyle MacLachlan and Will Janowitz) - Grand Theft Auto III, Grand Theft Auto: Vice City, and Grand Theft Auto: Liberty City Stories
Walton Lowe (P.J. Sosko) - Red Dead Redemption
Luther (Oliver Wyman) -  The Warriors
Martin Madrazo (Alfredo Huereca) - Grand Theft Auto V
Maero (Michael Dorn) - Saints Row 2 and Saints Row IV
Goro Majima (Hidenari Ugaki and Mark Hamill) - Yakuza
Sal Marcano (Jay Acovone) - Mafia 3
Masai (Charles Parnell) - The Warriors
Maxie - Pokémon Ruby and Sapphire and Pokémon Emerald
Matt Miller (Yuri Lowenthal) - Saints Row: The Third
Big Moe (Billy Griffith) - The Warriors
Big Jesus Mordino - Fallout 2
Don Marcu Morello (John Doman and Saul Stein) - Mafia and Mafia: Definitive Edition
Muggshot the Bulldog (Kevin Blackton) - Sly Cooper
Colm O'Driscoll (Andrew Berg) - Red Dead Redemption 2
Manuel Orejuela (Carlos Ferro) - Saints Row
Kokichi Ouma - Danganronpa V3: Killing Harmony
Jimmy Pegorino (Tony Patellis) - Grand Theft Auto IV
Pharaoh (Lemon Andersen) - The Warriors
Trevor Philips (Steven Ogg) - Grand Theft Auto V
Don Pianta - Paper Mario: The Thousand-Year Door
Joseph Price (Gregory Sims) - Saints Row
Angelo Punchinello (Joe Ragno) - Max Payne
Dimitri Rascalov (Moti Margolin) - Grand Theft Auto IV
Rayze - Fallout demo
Motor-Runner (Jesse Burch) - Fallout: New Vegas
Sadako - TimeSplitters 2
Don Ennio Salieri (George DiCenzo and Glenn Taranto) - Mafia and Mafia: Definitive Edition
Louis Salvatore - Fallout 2
Vito Scaletta (Rick Pasqualone) - Mafia 2 and 3
William Sharp (David Carradine) - Saints Row
Sid (Dennis L. A. White) - The Warriors
Spider (Michael Goz) - The Warriors
Starr (Maine Anders) - The Warriors
El Sueño - Tom Clancy's Ghost Recon: Wildlands
Sully (Robert Cihra) - The Warriors
Swan (Michael Beck) - The Warriors
Tiny (James Lorenzo) - The Warriors
Aria T'Loak (Carrie-Anne Moss) - Mass Effect 2
Big Tony - TimeSplitters 2
Massimo Torini (Duccio Fraggella) - Grand Theft Auto: Liberty City Stories
Tracer (Holter Graham) - The Warriors
Aldo Trapani (Andrew Pifko) - The Godfather
Vance (Holter Graham) - The Warriors
Victor Vance (Dorian Missick and Armando Riesco) - Grand Theft Auto: Vice City and Grand Theft Auto: Vice City Stories
Dutch van der Linde (Benjamin Byron Davis) - Red Dead Redemption and Red Dead Redemption 2
Vargas (The Greg Wilson) - The Warriors
Tommy Vercetti (Ray Liotta) - Grand Theft Auto: Vice City
 Franco "Frank" Vinci (Larry Kenney) - Mafia 2
Virgil (Curtiss Cook) - The Warriors
Wario (Charles Martinet) Mario series - Super Smash Brothers Brawl, Super Smash Brothers for Nintendo 3DS and Wii U, Super Smash Brothers Ultimate, Wario Land & Wario Ware
Don Weaso - Conker's Bad Fur Day
Marty J. Williams (Jim Burke) - Grand Theft Auto: Vice City Stories
Bill Williamson (Steve J. Palmer) - Red Dead Redemption
Orville Wright - Fallout 2
Mr. X - Streets of Rage series
Junya Kaneshiro (Kazunari Tanaka) - Persona 5

See also
List of crime bosses

crime bosses